is the debut studio album by Chara, which was released on November 11, 1991. It debuted at #64 on the Japanese Oricon album charts, and charted in the top 200 for two weeks. It eventually sold 11,000 copies, making it Chara's least sold album.

It was preceded by her debut single Heaven in September. The album also had two re-cut singles: the title track Sweet (released in January) and a remix single called No Toy (Re-Mix), featuring three alternative mixes of album tracks. None of these three songs charted in the Oricon top 100 singles.

Track listing

Japan Sales Rankings

References
 	

Chara (singer) albums
1991 debut albums